The Girls' Domestic Science and Arts Building is an academic building on the campus of the Arkansas Tech University in Russellville, Arkansas. It is a -story masonry building, with a tile hip roof, and walls finished in brick and stone.  The roof is pierced by hip-roofed dormers on both the long and short sides.  It was built in 1913 and extensively renovated in 1935. It is now known as the Old Art Building.  The Public Works Administration provided funds for school construction in January 1934, of which $7,500 was allocated for renovating this building.

The building was listed on the U.S. National Register of Historic Places in 1992.

See also
National Register of Historic Places listings in Pope County, Arkansas

References

Arkansas Tech University
School buildings on the National Register of Historic Places in Arkansas
Buildings and structures in Russellville, Arkansas
National Register of Historic Places in Pope County, Arkansas
Home economics education
School buildings completed in 1913
1913 establishments in Arkansas
Works Progress Administration in Arkansas
History of women in Arkansas